Pheidole leoncortesi is a species of ant in the genus Pheidole. It was discovered and described by Longino, J. T. in 2009.

References

leoncortesi
Insects described in 2009